Aleksandr Yuryevich Ektov (born 30 January 1996) is a Russian football player who plays for FC Orenburg. He is deployed in multiple positions, as a full-back or wide midfielder (both on right and left flank).

Club career
He made his debut in the Russian Professional Football League for FSK Dolgoprudny on 20 July 2016 in a game against FC Solyaris Moscow.

He made his Russian Football National League debut for FC Shinnik Yaroslavl on 7 July 2019 in a game against FC SKA-Khabarovsk.

Ektov made his Russian Premier League debut for FC Orenburg on 16 July 2022 against PFC Krylia Sovetov Samara.

Career statistics

References

External links
 
 
 

1996 births
People from Volokolamsky District
Sportspeople from Moscow Oblast
Living people
Russian footballers
Association football midfielders
PFC CSKA Moscow players
FC Olimp-Dolgoprudny players
FC Shinnik Yaroslavl players
FC Orenburg players
Russian Second League players
Russian First League players
Russian Premier League players